Ravang (also Romanized as Rāvang and Ravanag; also known as Rābin and Rāving) is a village in Karian Rural District, in the Central District of Minab County, Hormozgan Province, Iran. At the 2006 census, its population was 2,445, in 488 families.

Geography 

Ravang is right next to the ocean.

References 

Populated places in Minab County